The Vancouver International Film Festival (VIFF) is an annual film festival held in Vancouver, British Columbia, Canada, for two weeks in late September and early October.

The festival is operated by the Greater Vancouver International Film Festival Society, a provincially-registered non-profit and federally-registered charitable organization, which also runs the year-round programming of the Vancity Theatre and Studio Theatre at the VIFF Centre.

Both in terms of admissions and number of films screened (133,000 and 324 respectively in 2016), VIFF is among the five largest film festivals in North America. The festival screens films annually from approximately 73 countries on 10 screens.

The festival has three main programming platforms: East Asian film, Canadian film, and nonfiction films. Besides films from around the world, VIFF also includes talks, workshops, performances, and other special events related to cinema.

History
The festival was first launched in 1958; however, facing financial and organizational difficulties in the late 1960s, it was discontinued after the 1969 festival. The Greater Vancouver International Film Festival Society was incorporated in the early 1980s and relaunched the festival in its current form in 1982.

In 2019, Member of Parliament Hedy Fry, chairwoman of the Standing Committee on Canadian Heritage, announced that the Government of Canada would provide over $1.4 million in funding for that year's festival, as well as for cultural infrastructure upgrades to its main theatre.

Venues
The relaunched festival was staged entirely at the city's independent Ridge Theatre, although the festival has since expanded into a multi-venue event headquartered at the VIFF Centre in downtown Vancouver.

The VIFF Centre hosts VIFF's year-round programming, workshops, special events and collaborates with local organizations for special events.

Awards

Festival awards (juried and audience-voted):

 Most Popular International Film
 National Film Board Award for Best Documentary
 Special Jury Prize
 Kyoto Planet "Climate for Change" Award
 Dragons and Tigers Award for Young Cinema
Citytv Western Canadian Feature Film Award

Women In Film and Television Vancouver Artistic Merit Award
 Rogers People's Choice Award
 International Film Guide Inspiration Award
 documentary Audience Award
 VIFF Most Popular Canadian Film Award
 VIFF Environmental Film Audience Award
 Super Channel People's Choice Award
 Ignite Award
 VIFF IMPACT Award

BC Spotlight Awards
 Sea to Sky Award — a $20,000 cash prize awarded to one female key creative on a BC-produced feature or short.
 Best BC Film Award — $10,000 from Creative BC and $15,000 in post-production services credit supplied by Company 3.
 BC Emerging Filmmaker Award — a $5,000 award from UBCP/ACTRA, with an additional $10,000 equipment credit supplied by William F. White International Inc.

Canadian Awards
 Best Canadian Film — $15,000 award presented by the Directors Guild of Canada (DGC).
 Emerging Canadian Director — $3,000 award presented by the DGC.
 Best Canadian Documentary — $15,000 prize presented by the Rogers Group of Funds.
 Best BC Short Film — $5,000 award presented by TELUS Storyhive.
 Best Canadian Short Film — $15,000 in colour grading and/or VFX services credit supplied by Side Street Post and $2,000 award presented by VIFF.
 Most Promising Director of a Canadian Short Film 

International Awards
 VIFF Impact Award — CA$5,000 presented by the Lochmaddy Foundation to an international documentary playing in the 'Impact' competition.
Rob Stewart Eco Warrior Award — $5,000 prize presented by RBC and Cineplex to a documentary playing in the Impact competition that recognizes an outstanding contribution by an activist-storyteller.

VIFF Immersed Awards

VIFF Immersed Awards focus on narrative-driven virtual-reality experiences.

 Best in Cinematic Live-Action
 Best in Documentary
 Best in Animation
 Honorable Mention in Animation — determined by unanimous decision from the jury.
 Audience Award — determined by votes cast on the VeeR VR platform.

Audience Awards
 Super Channel People's Choice Award
 VIFF Most Popular International Feature
 VIFF Most Popular International Documentary
 VIFF Most Popular Canadian Documentary
 #mustseebc

Sustainable Production Excellence Awards
 Sustainable Production Impact
 Sustainable Production Champion

References

External links

VIFF on IMDb

 
Film festivals established in 1982
1982 establishments in British Columbia